Levi Lewis may refer to:

Levi Lewis (politician) (1762–1828), farmer and political figure in Upper Canada
Levi Lewis (American football) (born 1998), American football quarterback
Levi Lewis Dorr (1840–1934), American Civil War veteran and physician